Xia Zhou is an associate professor in the Department of Computer Science at Dartmouth College. Her current research centers on light. She co-directs the DartNets (Dartmouth Networking and Ubiquitous Systems) Lab and the Dartmouth Reality and Robotics Lab (RLab). She was a visiting faculty in National Taiwan University from December 2016 to February 2017, and in University of Cambridge from April 2017 to June 2017.

Early life and education

Xia Zhou received her PhD in Computer Science at UC Santa Barbara in June, 2013, working under the supervision of Haitao Zheng.

Honors and awards

During her career she received several honors and awards:
 Presidential Early Career Award for Scientists and Engineers) Lab (2019)
 ACM SIGMOBILE Rockstar Award (2019)
 Susan and Gib Myers 1964 Faculty Fellowship (2018)
 Karen E. Wetterhahn Memorial Award for Distinguished Creative and Scholarly Achievement (2018)
 N2Women: Rising Stars in Networking and Communication (2017)
 Alfred P. Sloan Research Fellowship (2017)
 NSF CAREER Award (2016)

References

External links
Home page of Xia Zhou

Living people
American computer scientists
American women computer scientists
Chinese computer scientists
Chinese women computer scientists
Dartmouth College faculty
Computer science educators
1984 births
Peking University alumni
Wuhan University alumni
American women academics
21st-century American women